Myrsine is a genus of flowering plants in the family Primulaceae. It was formerly placed in the family Myrsinaceae before this was merged into the Primulaceae. It is found nearly worldwide, primarily in tropical and subtropical areas. It contains about 200 species, including several notable radiations, such as the matipo of New Zealand and the kōlea of Hawaii (the New Zealand "black matipo", Pittosporum tenuifolium, is not related to Myrsine). In the United States, members of this genus are known as colicwood. Some species, especially M. africana, are grown as ornamental shrubs.

The leathery, evergreen leaves are simple and alternate, with smooth or toothed margins and without stipules. The one-seeded, indehiscent fruit is a thin-fleshed globose drupe. The flowers and fruits often do not develop until after leaf fall and thus appear naked on the branches. The fruits often do not mature until the year after flowering. The calyx is persistent.

The Pacific basin and New World species formerly separated in the genera Rapanea and Suttonia (distinguished from the African and Southeast Asian Myrsine sensu stricto by having the style absent and staminal tube and filaments completely adnate to the corolla) are now generally included in Myrsine.

Hawaiian species  
 Myrsine alyxifolia
 Myrsine denticulata
 Myrsine fernseei (Mez) Hosaka (Kauai in Hawaii)
 Myrsine helleri
 Myrsine kauaiensis
 Myrsine knudsenii (Rock) Hosaka (Kauai in Hawaii)
 Myrsine linearifolia
 Myrsine mezii Hosaka (Kauai in Hawaii)
 Myrsine petiolata Hosaka (Kauai in Hawaii)
 Myrsine wawraea
 Myrsine lanaiensis
 Myrsine lessertiana A.DC. – Kōlea lau nui (Hawaii)
 Myrsine fosbergii Hosaka (Oahu and Kauai in Hawaii)
 Myrsine punctata
 Myrsine sandwicensis A.DC. – Kōlea lau lii (Hawaii)
 Myrsine degeneri Hosaka (Oahu in Hawaii)
 Myrsine emarginata
 Myrsine juddii
 Myrsine pukooensis
 Myrsine vaccinioides

Other selected species
 Myrsine adamsonii Fosberg & Sachet (French Polynesia)
 Myrsine africana  (Africa, Southern Asia and the Azores)
 Myrsine andersonii Fosbert & Sachet (French Polynesia)
 Myrsine aquilonia 
 Myrsine argentea 
 Myrsine australis  – Red matipo, mapou (New Zealand)
 Myrsine brachyclada 
 Myrsine brownii Fosbert & Sachet (French Polynesia)
 Myrsine bullata Pipoly (Peru)
 Myrsine ceylanica (Mez) Wadhwa
 Myrsine cheesemanii (Mez) Hemsl. ex Prain (Cook Islands)
 Myrsine collina Nadeaud (Society Islands)
 Myrsine diazii Pipoly (Peru)
 Myrsine divaricata Cunn (New Zealand)
 Myrsine falcata Nadeaud (French Polynesia)
 Myrsine fasciculata (J.Moore) Fosberg & Sachet (French Polynesia)
 Myrsine fusca (J.Moore) Fosberg & Sachet (French Polynesia)
 Myrsine gracilissima Fosberg & Sachet (French Polynesia)
 Myrsine hartii 
 Myrsine hosakae H.St.John (Pitcairn Islands)
 Myrsine howittiana (F.Muell. ex Mez) Jackes (Eastern Australia)
 Myrsine juddii
 Myrsine juergensenii
 Myrsine kermadecensis 
 Myrsine laetevirens (Mez) Arechav.
 Myrsine niauensis Fosberg & Sachet (French Polynesia)
 Myrsine nukuhivensis Fosberg & Sachet (French Polynesia)
 Myrsine obovata (J.Moore) Fosberg & Sachet (French Polynesia)
 Myrsine oliveri Allan (New Zealand)
 Myrsine orohenensis (J.Moore) Fosberg & Sachet (French Polynesia)
 Myrsine pearcei (Mez) Pipoly (Peru)
 Myrsine raiateensis (J.Moore) Fosberg & Sachet (French Polynesia)
 Myrsine rapensis (F.Brown) Fosberg & Sachet (French Polynesia)
 Myrsine reynelii Pipoly (Peru)
 Myrsine richmondensis Jackes (Australia)
 Myrsine rivularis (Mez) Pipoly (Peru)
 Myrsine ronuiensis (M.Grant) Fosberg & Sachet (French Polynesia)
 Myrsine sodiroana (Mez) Pipoly (Ecuador)
 Myrsine tahuatensis Fosbert & Sachet (French Polynesia)
 Myrsine umbricola 
 Myrsine variabilis

References

 Ngā Tipu Aotearoa – Most recent taxonomy (only of NZ species).
 Flora of New Zealand.

External links
 
 

 
Primulaceae genera